"Heaven nor Hell" is a song by Danish rock band Volbeat. The song was released as the third single from the band's fourth studio album Beyond Hell/Above Heaven.

The song features Henrik Hall of Love Shop providing harmonica.

Content

Singer Michael Poulsen said, "It's a song that tells people to believe in themselves instead of using anything else as a crutch. ... instead of leaning up against any kind of religious belief."

Music video
A music video was released for the song and features the band performing the song in a desert junkyard. The video was directed by Uwe Flade.

Track listing

Charts

Weekly charts

Year-end charts

Certifications

References

2010 songs
2010 singles
Volbeat songs
EMI Records singles
Vertigo Records singles
Songs critical of religion
Republic Records singles
Universal Records singles
Songs written by Michael Poulsen